Events in the year 2022 in China.

Incumbents

Paramount leader

Head of state

Head of government

National legislature

Political advisory

Supervision commission

Communist Party secretaries

Governors

Events

January–March 
 9 January – Tianjin begins city-wide COVID-19 testing for 14 million people after 20 children and adults tested positive for COVID-19, two of whom were infected with the SARS-CoV-2 Omicron variant.
 4–20 February – 2022 Winter Olympics
 1 March:
 2022 Shanghai COVID-19 outbreak
 A new online religion management law enforced: People and organization no longer allowed to spread religious ideas in the internet unless they are authorized by the government. The law was passed in December 2021 and went into force on 1 March 2022.
 90th anniversary of establishment of Manchukuo
 4–13 March – 2022 Winter Paralympics
 21 March – China Eastern Airlines Flight 5735 descended steeply mid–flight and struck the ground at high speed in Teng County, Wuzhou, Guangxi Zhuang Autonomous Region, killing all 123 passengers and 9 crew members.

April–June 
 11 April – 2,500th anniversary of the death of Confucius
 29 April – Changsha building collapse
 12 May – Tibet Airlines Flight 9833
 1 June – 2022 Ya'an earthquake

July–September 
 24 August – Hainan announces it will ban the sale of new gasoline-powered cars by 2030.
 5 September – 2022 Luding earthquake
 18 September – 2022 Guizhou bus crash

October–December 
 13 October – A man protests at Sitong Bridge in Haidan District, Beijing
 16 October – 20th National Congress of the Chinese Communist Party
 23 October – Xi Jinping is re-elected as General Secretary of the Chinese Communist Party
 21 November – 2022 Anyang factory fire
 24 November – 2022 Ürümqi fire
 24 November – 2022 COVID-19 protests in China

Deaths 

 1 January – Xu Xingchu, 87, engineer, member of the Chinese Academy of Sciences
 2 January – Zhou Xiaofeng, 57, entrepreneur and politician, member of the National People's Congress (2008–2012)
 3 January – Zheng Min, 101, poet
 6 January – Zhang Jiqing, 83, Kunqu artist
 7 January – Liu Siqi, 91, public figure
 10 January – Liu Xianping, 83, writer
 12 January – Sun Bigan, 80, diplomat, ambassador to Saudi Arabia (1990–1994), Iraq (1994–1998) and Iran (1999–2002)
 30 November – Jiang Zemin, 96, politician, General Secretary of the Chinese Communist Party (1989–2002) and 4th paramount leader

See also

Country overviews 
 History of China
 History of modern China
 Outline of China
 Government of China
 Politics of China
 Timeline of Chinese history
 Years in China

References

Links 
 

 
China
China
2020s in China
Years of the 21st century in China